Railway electrification using  at  are used on transport railways in Germany, Austria, Switzerland, Sweden, and Norway. The high voltage enables high power transmission with the lower frequency reducing the losses of the traction motors that were available at the beginning of the 20th century. Railway electrification in late 20th century tends to use  AC systems which has become the preferred standard for new railway electrifications but extensions of the existing  networks are not completely unlikely. In particular, the Gotthard Base Tunnel (opened on 1 June 2016) still uses 15 kV, 16.7 Hz electrification.

Due to high conversion costs, it is unlikely that existing  systems will be converted to   despite the fact that this would reduce the weight of the on-board step-down transformers to one third that of the present devices.

History 
The first electrified railways used series-wound DC motors, first at 600 V and then 1,500 V. Areas with 3 kV DC catenaries (primarily in Eastern Europe) used two 1,500 V DC motors in series. But even at 3 kV, the current needed to power a heavy train (particularly in rural and mountainous areas) can be excessive. Although increasing the transmission voltage decreases the current and associated resistive losses for a given power, insulation limits make higher voltage traction motors impractical. Transformers on each locomotive are thus required to step high transmission voltages down to practical motor operating voltages. Before the development of suitable ways to efficiently transform DC currents through power electronics, efficient transformers strictly required alternating current (AC); thus high voltage electrified railways adopted AC along with the electric power distribution system (see War of the currents).

The 50 Hz (60 Hz in North America) AC grid was already established at the beginning of the 20th century. Although series-wound motors can in principle run on AC as well as DC (the reason they are also known as universal motors) large series-wound traction motors had problems with such high frequencies. High inductive reactance of the motor windings caused commutator flashover problems and the non-laminated magnetic pole-pieces originally designed for DC exhibited excessive eddy current losses. Using a lower AC frequency alleviated both problems.

This facilitated the operation of rotary converters from the grid frequency and allowed dedicated railway power generators to operate at the same shaft speed as a standard 50 Hz generator by reducing the number of pole pairs by a factor of three. For example, a generator turning at  would be wound with two pole pairs rather than six.

Separate plants supply railway power in Austria, Switzerland and Germany, except for Mecklenburg-Western Pomerania and Saxony-Anhalt; converters powered by the grid supply railway power in those two German states plus Sweden and Norway. Norway also has two hydro-electric power plants dedicated for railway power with  output.

The first generators were synchronous AC generators or synchronous transformers; however, with the introduction of modern double fed induction generators, the control current induced an undesired DC component, leading to pole overheating problems. This was solved by shifting the frequency slightly away from exactly ⅓ the grid frequency;  was arbitrarily chosen to remain within the tolerance of existing traction motors. Austria, Switzerland and Southern Germany switched their power plants to 16.7 Hz on 16 October 1995 at 12:00 CET. Note that regional electrified sections run by synchronous generators keep their frequency of  just as Sweden and Norway still run their railway networks at  throughout.

Low frequency transformers need to have heavier magnetic cores and larger windings for the same level of power conversion. (See effect of frequency on the design of transformers.) The heavier transformers also lead to higher axle loads than for those of a higher frequency. This, in turn, leads to increased track wear and increases the need for more frequent track maintenance. The Czech Railways encountered the problem of the reduced power handling of lower frequency transformers when they rebuilt some  AC,  locomotives (series 340) to operate on  AC,  lines. As a result of using the same transformer cores (originally designed for ) at the lower frequency, the transformers had to be de-rated to one third of their original power handling capability, thereby reducing the available tractive effort by the same amount (to around ).

These drawbacks, plus the need for a separate supply infrastructure and the lack of any technical advantages with modern motors and controllers has limited the use of  Hz and 16.7 Hz beyond the original five countries. Most other countries electrified their railways at the utility frequency of 50/60 Hz. Newer European electrification is mostly 25 kV AC at 50 Hz (primarily in Eastern Europe). Conversion to this voltage/frequency requires higher voltage insulators and greater clearance between lines and bridges and other structures. This is now standard for new overhead lines as well as for modernizing old installations. Denmark, despite bordering only 15 kV territory decided to electrify their mainline railways at 25 kV 50 Hz for that and other reasons.

Simple European standardization with an alignment of voltage/frequency across Europe is not necessarily cost-effective since trans-border traction is more limited by the differing national standards in other areas. To equip an electric locomotive with a transformer for two or more input voltages is cheap compared to the cost of installing multiple train protection systems and to run them through the approval procedure to get access to the railway network in other countries. However, some new high-speed lines to neighbouring countries are already intended to be built to 25 kV (e.g. in Austria to Eastern Europe). Newer locomotives are always built with asynchronous motor control systems that have no problem with a range of input frequencies including DC. However the Deutsche Bahn train operator does still use older models from the standard electric locomotive series—even though some are now as much as 50 years old. As soon as these obsolescent models are decommissioned, it will be easier to standardise, but this may take a few decades to happen. Meanwhile, the Deutsche Bahn tends to order train sets that are capable of running multiple electrification systems.

Distribution networks 

This system is called the centralized railway energy supply. A separate single-phase power distribution grid makes the recuperation of energy during braking extremely easy in comparison with 25kV 50 Hz system tied to 3 phase distribution grid.

In Sweden, Norway, Mecklenburg-Western Pomerania and Saxony-Anhalt, the power is taken directly from the three-phase grid ( at ), converted to low frequency single phase and fed into the overhead line. This system is called the decentralized (i.e. local) railway energy supply.

Generation and conversion 
This is similar to split-phase electric power systems and results in a balanced line transmission. The inductance through which the earthing is done is designed to limit earth currents in cases of faults on the line.

Asynchronous converters 
The frequency of  depends on the necessity to avoid synchronism in parts of the rotary machine, which consists principally of a three phase asynchronous motor and a single phase synchronous generator.

Synchronous converters 
The power for the decentralized system is taken directly from the national power grid and directly transformed and converted into ,  by synchronous-synchronous-converters or static converters. Both systems need additional transformers. The converters consist of a three-phase synchronous motor and a single-phase synchronous generator. The decentralized system in the north-east of Germany was established by the Deutsche Reichsbahn in the 1980s, because there was no centralized system available in these areas.

Facilities for 15 kV AC railway electrification in Germany, Austria and Switzerland 

Germany, Austria and Switzerland operate the largest interconnected 15 kV AC system with central generation, and central and local converter plants.

Norway 
In Norway all electric railways use 15 kV 16 Hz AC (except the Thamshavnbanen museum railway which uses 6.6 kV 25 Hz AC). The Oslo T-bane and tramways use 750 V DC power.

Sweden 

In Sweden most electric railways use 15 kV 16 Hz AC. Exceptions include: Saltsjöbanan and Roslagsbanan (1.5 kV DC), the Stockholm Metro (650 V and 750 V DC) and tramways (750 V DC). The Oresund Bridge linking Sweden and Denmark is electrified at 25 kV, Danish standard; the split is located on the Swedish side near the bridge. Only two-system trains (or diesel trains; rare) can pass the point.

See also

 List of railway electrification systems
 :Category:15 kV AC locomotives
 25 Hz Power Transmission System
 25 kV AC railway electrification
 Rotary phase converter
 Seebach-Wettingen railway electrification trial
 Traction power network

References

External links
 DB Energie soll Durchleitung von Bahnstrom ermöglichen 

 
Electric power distribution
Electric rail transport